Timothy R. O'Neill (born 1943) is an American U.S. Army officer, professor and camouflage expert, responsible for designing the digital camouflage pattern MARPAT. He has been called "father of digital camouflage". O'Neill is the author of two works of fiction. In 1979 he published The Individuated Hobbit: Jung, Tolkien, and the Archetypes of Middle-Earth.

Life

Timothy O'Neill was educated at The Citadel, Charleston, gaining a bachelor's degree in political science; the University of North Carolina at Chapel Hill, studying MACT and experimental psychology; and after joining the army, the University of Virginia, where he gained his PhD in Experimental Psychology with a concentration in visual biophysics, writing his dissertation on "visual attraction of Blumian symmetry axes of visual forms". He served in the U. S. Army for 25 years from 1966. He served initially as a commander of tank and armoured cavalry units. He gained a doctorate in camouflage, testing his ideas in the field at Fort Knox, Kentucky. In 1976, this work gained him a post as instructor at the West Point military academy, where he founded and was the first director of the program in engineering psychology. His work on digital camouflage led to the camouflage used on Army Combat Uniform. He reached the rank of lieutenant colonel. He retired from the army in 1991.

He then worked in industry, in Provant, Inc, and in U. S. Cavalry Security Gear and Systems, Inc. From 2001, he has frequently served as a camouflage consultant, working for the U. S. Army, Navy, and Marine Corps; the FBI; and the armed forces of Afghanistan, Canada, New Zealand, and Qatar. He assisted in the design of hunting camouflage for W. L. Gore Associates, creating the Optifade pattern, based for the first time on study of the vision of deer, i.e. the animals that are to be fooled by the camouflage: it combines macro- and micro-patterns, and is said to work "amazingly well". For Hyperstealth Corp., he and the company's founder Guy Cramer designed the Razzacam pattern, said by David Rothenberg to be based on World War I dazzle camouflage "with pixelated and dithered patterns that are dizzying to look at, confounding our ability to parse their organizational structure". Also with Cramer, O'Neill developed a snow camouflage pattern for the U. S. Marine Corps.

Digital camouflage
 

In 1976, O'Neill created a pixellated pattern named "Dual-Tex". He called the digital approach "texture match". The initial work was done by hand on a retired M113 armoured personnel carrier at the Aberdeen Proving Ground in Maryland; O'Neill painted the pattern on with a 2-inch (5 centimetre) roller, forming squares of colour by hand. Field testing showed that the result was good compared to the U. S. Army's existing camouflage patterns. At a distance, the squares merged into a larger pattern, breaking up the vehicle's outline and making it blend into the background of trees. Closer up, the pattern successfully imitated smaller details of the landscape, appearing as leaves, grass tufts, and shadows.

O'Neill was quoted in a report by an American government watchdog, the Special Inspector General for Afghanistan Reconstruction, which was critical of wasteful Pentagon spending. O'Neill is reported as stating of the camouflage pattern then in use: "Desert designs don't work well in woodland areas and woodland patterns perform poorly in the desert." In O'Neill's view, "it is best to tailor the spatial characteristics and color palette of a camouflage pattern to the specific environment and tactical position where those using the camouflage would be inclined to hide."

Author
The Individuated Hobbit: Jung, Tolkien, and the Archetypes of Middle-Earth (1979) is a critical study of the works of J.R.R. Tolkien. Tolkien scholar Thomas Honegger called it "the unsurpassed standard work on the subject" (2019).

He is the author or two novels. Shades of Gray (1987) is about a West Point psychologist investigating mysterious happenings on campus. Mandala (2014) concerns a mysterious structure in Montana that has psychological and mythic properties.

Distinctions

O'Neill has been called the father of digital camouflage. He is featured in the 2015 Australian documentary film Deception by Design.

Personal life

O'Neill is married to Eufrona O'Neill and they live in Alexandria, Virginia.

Bibliography
 1979 The Individuated Hobbit
 2013 Shades of Gray (novel)
 2014 Mandala (novel)

References

Camouflage
United States Army officers
Living people
1943 births
Camouflage researchers